McIntosh or Mackintosh may refer to:

Products and brands 
 Mackintosh, a form of waterproof raincoat
 Mackintosh's or John Mackintosh and Co., later Rowntree Mackintosh, former UK confectionery company now part of Nestlé
 Mackintosh's Toffee, a Nestlé confectionery
 McIntosh (apple), an apple cultivar named for John McIntosh (farmer)
 McIntosh Laboratory, an American manufacturer of high-end audio equipment

People 
 McIntosh (surname)

Places 
In the United States
 McIntosh, Alabama, a town
 McIntosh, Florida, a town
 McIntosh, Georgia, an unincorporated community
 McIntosh, Missouri, an unincorporated community
 McIntosh, Minnesota, a city
 McIntosh, South Dakota, a city
 McIntosh, Washington, an unincorporated community
 McIntosh County (disambiguation)

In Canada
McIntosh, Bruce County, Ontario, an unincorporated community
McIntosh, Kenora District, Ontario, an unincorporated place

In outer space
5061 McIntosh, an asteroid

Other uses 
 Viscount Mackintosh of Halifax, a title in the Peerage of the United Kingdom (also Baron Mackintosh of Halifax)
 Fort McIntosh (disambiguation), three former military installations in the United States
 McIntosh Reserve, an outdoor recreational area in Carroll County, Georgia
 McIntosh High School, Peachtree County, Georgia, United States

See also 
 Macintosh (disambiguation)